The Burkittsville Historic District comprises the small town of Burkittsville, Maryland.  Located at a crossroads in western Frederick County, the town is a consistent collection of early 19th-century Federal style houses mixed with a few Victorian style houses that has remained virtually unchanged since 1900.  The town is surrounded on three sides by an open, farmed landscape, and nestles against South Mountain on its western side.

The town was involved in a number of Civil War actions, including the Battle of Crampton's Gap in 1862.

The Burkittsville Historic District was listed on the National Register of Historic Places in 1975.

References

External links
, including 1996 photo, at Maryland Historical Trust
Boundary Map of the Burkittsville Historic District, Frederick County, at Maryland Historical Trust

1975 establishments in Maryland
States and territories established in 1975
Historic districts on the National Register of Historic Places in Maryland
Federal architecture in Maryland
Victorian architecture in Maryland
Historic districts in Frederick County, Maryland
Journey Through Hallowed Ground National Heritage Area
National Register of Historic Places in Frederick County, Maryland
Burkittsville, Maryland